"The Baddest" (stylized in all caps) is a song by virtual K-pop girl group K/DA. It was released on August 27, 2020, as the pre-release single from their debut extended play All Out. It is K/DA's first song since "Pop/Stars" in 2018. The song was composed by Riot Music Team in collaboration with Bekuh Boom. The song was accompanied by a lyric video which was uploaded to League of Legends' official YouTube channel on the same day.

Background and release
K/DA launched their official Twitter and Instagram account on August 20. Simultaneously, Riot Games revealed the single image of the K/DA logo, including the comeback's date and the titled of their pre-release song with the phrase "YOUTUBE PREMIERE 8.27.2020 12 PM PT #KDA #CALLINGALLBLADES #KDAISBACK #COMEBACK #THEBADDEST". Starting August 24, 2020, K/DA individual images with new appearance and member introduction were released from Ahri the Queen, Evelynn the Diva, Kai’Sa the Dancer to Akali the Rebel. Ahead of its release, League of Legends' Shazam page revealed Wolftyla and Bea Miller would take over the roles of Kai’Sa and Evelynn; original artists Jaira Burns and Madison Beer reprised their roles in later K/DA songs.

Composition
In terms of music notation, "The Baddest" was composed using  common time, written in the key of E-flat major with a tempo of 135 beats per minute, and a running time of 2:42 minutes. Soyeon and Miyeon of (G)I-dle, Bea Miller, and Wolftyla provide vocals for the song.

Critical reception
Mike Stubbs from Forbes wrote in his article that he "only listened to it a handful of times and it is already stuck in [his] head!" Shacknews's TJ Denzer was impressed by the music video, saying that "it brings back the pop stylized versions of in-game champions Ahri, Evelynn, Akali, and Kai’Sa in full and fashionable form to deliver The Baddest", and described the song as "a cornucopia of good vocals and visuals set to an entrancing beat". League of Legends European Championship (LEC) caster Daniel Drakos didn't really like the song upon first hearing it on Twitter. Instead, he recommends listening to The Baddest on music streaming platforms like Spotify and Apple Music for better sound quality. Meanwhile, another LEC caster, Indiana "Froskurinn" Black, was fond of Kai'Sa's lines "I came to slay back and I'm better and ready to stay."

"The Baddest" was included in Hyperbae'''s Best K-pop Songs and Music Videos of 2020.

Track listing
Download and streaming
 "The Baddest" – 2:42
 "The Baddest" (inst.) – 2:42

Credits and personnel
Credits are adapted from Melon and Tidal.

 Vocals – Soyeon and Miyeon of (G)I-dle, Bea Miller and Wolftyla 
 Riot Music Team – production, composer, songwriting, vocal production, mix engineer, mastering engineer
 Sebastien Najand – composer
 Bekuh Boom – songwriting, additional vocals
 Lydia Paek – Korean translation
 Minji Kim – Korean translation
 Oscar Free – vocal production

Lyric video
On August 27, a live countdown started at 12 PM PT on League of Legends's official YouTube channel, with nearly 180,000 viewers live on during its premiere. In 10 minutes, the video surpassed 500,000+ views, and reached 4 million views in 8 hours. The video was directed by Riot Games and Jordan Taylor Studios who had previously work for Pitch Perfect 2, Netflix's documentary film Kingdom of Us'' and Joey Badass' "Unorthodox". The next day, Riot Korea released a behind-the-scenes video of (G)I-dle's recording session of the song.

Accolades

Charts

Release history

See also
 List of K-pop songs on the Billboard charts

References

External links

2020 singles
2020 songs
(G)I-dle songs
K-pop songs
Macaronic songs
League of Legends World Championship